USS Winslow (DD-359/AG-127) was a  in service with the United States Navy from 1937 to 1950. She was scrapped in 1959.

History
Winslow was named after Rear Admiral John Ancrum Winslow and Cameron McRae Winslow. She was laid down on 18 December 1933 at Camden, New Jersey, by the New York Shipbuilding Corporation; launched on 21 September 1936; sponsored by Miss Mary Blythe Winslow; and commissioned at the Philadelphia Navy Yard on 17 February 1937, Commander Irving R. Chambers in command.

Pre-World War II
The warship completed outfitting in October and, on the 19th, embarked upon a shakedown cruise which took her to a number of European ports. Upon her return to the western hemisphere, she passed her final acceptance trials off the coast of Maine and was assigned to Battle Force, Destroyers, in the Pacific. Early in 1938, she transited the Panama Canal and joined Destroyer Squadron 9 at San Diego, California. Over the next three years, Winslow conducted operations in the eastern Pacific—generally between Hawaii and the west coast—from her home port at San Diego.

By 1941, events in Europe—where World War II was already in its second year—necessitated the strengthening of American naval forces in the Atlantic. Accordingly, Winslow retransited the canal in April and, after visiting Guantanamo Bay in Cuba, reported for duty at Norfolk, Virginia. That summer, she conducted training operations with submarines off the New England coast. Later, she also participated in Neutrality patrols, particularly those directed at keeping watch over the Vichy French ships at Martinique and Guadeloupe in the French Antilles. Early in August, Winslow joined Tuscaloosa (CA-37) in escorting Augusta (CA-31) as that heavy cruiser carried President Franklin D. Roosevelt to NS Argentia, Newfoundland, to meet British Prime Minister Winston Churchill in the conference which resulted in the Atlantic Charter. Then, after escorting transports carrying reinforcements to Iceland, the destroyer arrived in Halifax, Nova Scotia, early in November and became a unit in the screen of America's first convoy to Southeast Asia. Convoy WS-12X, bound via the Cape of Good Hope for Singapore, departed Halifax on 10 November. Just before the convoy reached Cape Town, South Africa, where the destroyers were to part company with the convoy and head for home, word arrived that the Japanese had attacked Pearl Harbor.

1942-1943
After leaving the convoy at Cape Town, Winslow returned to the United States where she was assigned to Vice Admiral Jonas H. Ingrain's 4th Fleet, which had grown out of the South Atlantic neutrality patrols. The warship patrolled the area between Brazil and Africa, searching for German submarines and blockade runners until April 1944. On two occasions during that period, she returned briefly to the United States—in June 1942 and in October 1943—to undergo repairs at Charleston, South Carolina.

1944-1945
In April 1944, the warship began escorting newly constructed warships from Boston, Massachusetts via Norfolk, to the West Indies. After three such voyages, she began escorting convoys from New York to England and Ireland in August. She made five round-trip voyages across the Atlantic before putting into Charleston again in March 1945 for a four-month overhaul.

While in Charleston for alterations, she lost her torpedo tubes, traded her light, single-purpose, 5 inch guns for five dual-purpose 5 inch guns. In addition, she received 16 40-millimeter and four 20-millimeter antiaircraft guns in preparation for services in the Pacific.

However, by the end of her refresher training out of Casco Bay, Maine, hostilities had ceased. Accordingly, Winslow received orders to begin experimental work testing antiaircraft ordnance. On 17 September 1945, the ship was redesignated AG-127.

Post-World War II and fate
She continued her experimental work with the Operational Development Force until she was decommissioned on 28 June 1950. Winslow remained in reserve, berthed with the Charleston Group, Atlantic Reserve Fleet, until declared unfit for further naval service on 5 December 1957. Her name was struck from the Navy list on that same day, and she was sold on 23 February 1959 for scrapping.

References

 

Porter-class destroyers
World War II destroyers of the United States
Ships built by New York Shipbuilding Corporation
1936 ships